Cheshmeh Rizak-e Shabliz (also Romanized as Cheshmeh Rīzak-e Shablīz) is a village in Pataveh Rural District, Pataveh District, Dana County, Kohgiluyeh and Boyer-Ahmad Province, Iran. At the 2006 census, its population was 47, in 9 families.

References 

Populated places in Dana County